is an athletic stadium in Matsue, Shimane, Japan.

External links

Football venues in Japan
Sports venues in Shimane Prefecture